Joyce Scott Lindores (2 May 1944 – 18 June 2017) was a Scottish international indoor and lawn bowler.

Bowls career
Lindores won the Women's singles at the 1995 World Indoor Bowls Championship defeating Margaret Johnston in the final. Three years later she won the pairs gold medal with Margaret Letham at the 1998 Commonwealth Games. The pair then won the pairs title at the 2000 World Outdoor Bowls Championship in Moama, Australia.

In 2005 she won the pairs and fours silver medals at the Atlantic Bowls Championships in Bangor, previously she had won a triples bronze in 1997 and pairs gold in 1999.

She also won the Scottish National Bowls Championships singles title in 1988 and 1997 and the pairs in 1993 bowling for Ettrick Forest.

Lindores remained in  Melbourne after the 2006 Commonwealth Games held there. She died on 18 June 2017 in Melbourne.

References

1944 births
2017 deaths
Scottish female bowls players
Bowls World Champions
Scottish emigrants to Australia
People from Galashiels
Bowls players at the 1990 Commonwealth Games
Bowls players at the 1994 Commonwealth Games
Bowls players at the 1998 Commonwealth Games
Bowls players at the 2002 Commonwealth Games
Bowls players at the 2006 Commonwealth Games
Commonwealth Games gold medallists for Scotland
Commonwealth Games medallists in lawn bowls
Indoor Bowls World Champions
Bowls European Champions
Medallists at the 1998 Commonwealth Games